Nicola Conci (born 5 January 1997) is an Italian cyclist, who rides for UCI WorldTeam .

Career
In August 2018, he was named in the startlist for the Vuelta a España. In May 2019, he was named in the startlist for the 2019 Giro d'Italia.

After  lost its UCI license and its riders lost their contracts on 1 March 2022, Conci was left without a job.

Major results

2017
 1st Gran Premio Sportivi di Poggiana
 1st Trofeo Città di San Vendemiano
 4th Trofeo Piva
 6th Ruota d'Oro
 6th Trofeo Edil C
 7th Overall Giro Ciclistico d'Italia
 8th G.P. Palio del Recioto
2019
 5th Overall Adriatica Ionica Race
2020
 5th Overall Settimana Internazionale di Coppi e Bartali
 6th Coppa Sabatini
2022
 3rd Overall Arctic Race of Norway
 3rd Veneto Classic
 6th Overall Tour of Slovenia
 6th Overall Giro di Sicilia
 7th Giro del Veneto
 9th Per sempre Alfredo
 10th Overall Settimana Internazionale di Coppi e Bartali
2023
 9th Figueira Champions Classic

Grand Tour general classification results timeline

References

External links

1997 births
Living people
Italian male cyclists
Sportspeople from Trento
Cyclists from Trentino-Alto Adige/Südtirol